Viktor Frantsevich Yanushevsky (23 January 1960 – 23 June 1992) was a Soviet and Belarusian professional footballer who played as a defender. He died during a training session of a heart attack.

International career 
Yanushevsky made his debut for USSR on 28 March 1984 in a friendly against West Germany.

Honours 
Dinamo Minsk
 Soviet Top League: 1982

CSKA Moscow
 Soviet Top League: 1991
 Soviet Cup: 1990–91

Soviet Union
 UEFA European Under-18 Football Championship: 1978

External links 
 Profile 

1960 births
1992 deaths
Footballers from Minsk
Soviet footballers
Soviet Union international footballers
Belarusian footballers
Belarusian expatriate footballers
Association football defenders
Soviet Top League players
Russian Premier League players
English Football League players
FC Dinamo Minsk players
PFC CSKA Moscow players
Aldershot F.C. players
Tennis Borussia Berlin players
Soviet expatriate footballers
Expatriate footballers in England
Expatriate footballers in Germany